The 1988 Summer Paralympics were the first Paralympics in 24 years to take place in the same city as the Olympic Games. They took place in Seoul, South Korea. This was the first time the term "Paralympic" was used officially.

Bidding process
During the fourth meeting of the International Paralympic Committee held at the Aylesbury Civic Center in England (28 July 1983), two candidate cities made themselves known;

 Seoul, South Korea, under the initiative of Dr. Whang Youn Dai
 Melbourne, Australia, under the initiative of Dr. John Grant

The ICC sent a questionnaire to gauge the cities' interest and preparedness for hosting such an event. Both candidates were given one year to respond. In the end, only Seoul returned with a completed document; Melbourne did not respond to the ICC. 

At the same time, a political movement in Australia to have Brisbane host the 1992 Summer Olympics and Paralympic events weakened the case for Melbourne to be a host city in 1988. 

A final choice would have to be made during the sixth meeting of ICC, scheduled for 14 June 1984 in New York City, and Seoul was selected to host the 1988 events. 

As the 1988 Olympic and Paralympic games were the first to be hosted in the same city, the Games in Seoul allowed a new generation of Paralympic athletes to compete in many of the well-designed and well-constructed facilities previously only used for the Olympic Games. The medal results have shown the importance of assistance from host countries.

Relation between the Olympic and Paralympic Organizing Committees

The Seoul Paralympic Organizing Committee (SEPOC) had only a tangential relationship with the Seoul Olympic Organizing Committee (SLOOC). But this relationship was substantial enough to recruit and train many athletes, technical officials and other common areas for the Paralympic Games.

Background 
For the first time in history since Tokyo 1964, the same city held the Olympics and Paralympics. This tradition was revived in Seoul and has been kept ever since. This was also the first Summer Paralympics in history under the aegis of the International Co-ordinating Committee (ICC). In 1982, the Olympic Family accepted the ICC, which allowed greater cooperation by National Olympic Committees regarding the organization of the Paralympic Games. The Seoul Olympic Organizing Committee (SLOOC) regarded the Paralympic Games as an extension of the Olympic Games and formulated a support plan which allowed the sharing of the Seoul Olympic workforce, facilities, equipment, and key personnel. The SLOOC gave a subsidy of US$12,857,143.

A specific village for the Paralympic Games 
Before the 1988 Summer Olympic Games, local citizens had bought all 3,962 apartments at 86 buildings from the Olympic Village. Due to high local demands, the complex was hastily evicted after. 

Between 1983 and 1989, Seoul authorities were in the middle of many controversies about the evictions of poor and low-income neighborhoods. Human rights monitors raised these concerns and associated the hosting of the 1986 Asian Games and the 1988 Summer Olympic Games with the actions to clean, redevelop and "beautify" the city, especially the decadent and historical Jamsil area. Despite the construction of gigantic building complexes to accommodate 720,000 people between 1983 and 1988, these new housing offers were unconceived for those who had been evicted – namely low-income or poor renters. When this situation turned public, as a result, scholars, policy-makers and lawyers advocated for a better social housing policy, including minimum housing standards and a higher degree of transparency from the city government.

Consequently, there was not enough time to convert the apartments and facilities to better conditions of accessibility. Another difficult situation was that the transition time between the two events was insufficient (the opening ceremony was on October 15th, 13 days after the end of the Olympic Games). Thus, the government of South Korea and the prefecture of Seoul understood that building a specific Paralympic Village was necessary. This complex was 4km from an intersection between the Seoul Olympic Park and Jamsil Complex clusters. It was the first housing complex in the country to be fully accessible to people with disabilities, as the athletes lived in ten specially designed and accessible apartment blocks with 1,316 new apartments in total. Each building had a height of fourteen stories.

Between 1982 to 1986, a delegation composed of some members of the organization of architects sent by Seoul and the Government of South Korea visited the Stoke Mandeville Hospital to research the accessibility of the hospital. They were also to collect information about the complex to design a project to build a specific village. 

Due to specific characteristics, this would be the first and only time in history that a Village for the Paralympic Games was to be built. Since this was not foreseen (SEPOC had made plans to use the same Village and Venues), the ICC saw Seoul Paralympics Village plans as controversial in some points. One point caused some concern: three of the ten buildings would be exclusive for wheelchair users; the entity had never managed a complex of such large proportions as this. 

A question was asked about wheelchair users being evacuated from the buildings in case of internal commotions (such as fires or water leaks). The answer from the architects and planners was simple - in addition to the elevators, each building planned to have a complex of ramps that would go up to the fourteenth floor; this process would be faster and safer. All services that were available in the Olympic Village were replicated on a smaller scale. The SEPOC offered catering, recreation areas, banking, post office facilities, medical and religious centers, an Olympic/Paralympic store and a mall. The 1988 Seoul Paralympic Games was also the first time the Olympics and Paralympics shared some competition venues. The two respective Organizing Committees shared common services such as the transport area and the logistics, security and human resources (SLOOC assumed practically all the training and capacity building of volunteers and workforce). 

Since then, every Winter and Summer Paralympic Games has been held in the same cities as the Olympic Games.

Visual identity   
When the games ended, the logo used by the Seoul Paralympic Organizing Committee (SEPOC) turned into the first Paralympic symbol. This symbol was used from 1989–1994. The Five 'teardrops' (resembling the halves of the taeguk pattern, also found in the South Korean flag) in the 'W' configuration and colors of the Olympic rings represented the five oceans and the five continents. Due to many controversies starting in 1989, this symbol was eventually changed after the 1994 Winter Paralympics, as it was considered too close to the International Olympic Committee's (IOC) 5-ring emblem. Due to these actions, the 1988 Seoul Summer Paralympic Games is considered the start of the Modern Paralympic Games.

Mascots

According to Korean ancestral culture, bears are known for their courage and wisdom, which is reflected by the existence of two sister constellations: Ursa Major and Ursa Minor. The two bears chosen as mascots are of a species known as the Asian black bear. This practice was common on the Korean peninsula and was marked by the white V-shaped chest mark. The two chosen mascots are brothers tied by a rope to the leg; this demonstrates the brotherhood, guidance, coherent and coexistent cooperation and relationship that the Olympic and Paralympic Games would have now: dreamt of by the Organizing Committee of this edition of the Paralympics. They also represented achievements and camaraderie recorded during the event. The name chosen for the mascots was Gomdoori.

Opening ceremony 

During the Opening Ceremony, over 75,000 people in the Olympic Stadium were watching a then-record of 3,057 competitors from 61 nations. The President of South Korea, Roh Tae-Woo, presented the new Paralympic flag to the President of the ICC, Jens Bromann. Paul Croft, competing in his second Paralympic Games, was the flag bearer for Australia. 

Several elements used in the opening and closing ceremonies of the Olympic Games were recycled or made on a smaller scale. The first entry was made by parachutists in the Paralympic colors of blue, black, red, yellow, and green. They swept into the Olympic Stadium following a procession of children in wheelchairs. The Olympic Torch was carried in by a one-legged South Korean Paralympic volleyball player and handed to a 19-year-old athlete with cerebral palsy, who in turn passed it to Cho Hyun-hui, a wheelchair athlete. He was wheeled around the stadium by her 7-year-old daughter before handing the Torch to blind runner Lee Jae-oon, who linked hands with women's handball Olympic gold medalist Kiifi Hyun-mi. They were both carried up by an elevator platform to light the Olympic Cauldron. The 2018 Winter Paralympics opening ceremony (also held in South Korea) recreated this scene.

Chief Paralympic Organiser Koh Kwi-nam addressed the athletes. He said that "The goal you as athletes should try to reach for in the Games is not to accomplish the Olympic slogan of 'faster, higher and farther' but to show the world your real selves as courageous challengers, glorious conquerors and impartial participants."

Controversies 
Despite the advances, the Seoul Paralympic Games also took place with several controversies, embarrassments and polemics. On the first day, the Iranian goalball team was disqualified for refusing to play against the Israeli team; the Iranian team had misused the sporting platform for political aims. After the draw, the ICC sent the team home immediately. Asghar Dadkhan, the Iranian team manager, made a formal apology pledging that all other Iranian athletes would compete with full regard to the regulations and would compete against Israel and any other nation.

Due to logistic problems, the Libyan delegation arrived in Seoul some days after the opening ceremony; the ICC rules did not allow this situation. Their athletes could not register for the events or stay in the Paralympic Village. They had entered South Korea without having gone through the usual entry procedures. The SEPOC urged the ICC to accept the Libyan team; soon after, they reached a compromise, permitting the athletes and delegates to participate as observers and compete in the marathon events. However, they would not have any medal entitlement nor be officially recognized at the Closing Ceremony.

Another embarrassing moment happened at the athletics slalom event: some athletes were given medals at the end of the first round. Later, officials realized that the medals should not have been awarded until after the second round of competition.

Sports 
The games consisted of events in seventeen sports, including one demonstration sport, but the medals count for the official medal list. Powerlifting and weightlifting were considered to be a single sport.

 Archery
 Athletics
 Boccia
 Cycling
 Football 7-a-side
 Goalball
 Judo
 Lawn bowls
 Lifting
 Powerlifting
 Weightlifting
 Shooting
 Snooker
 Swimming
 Table tennis
 Volleyball
 Wheelchair basketball
 Wheelchair fencing
 Wheelchair tennis (demonstration sport)

Venues

Medal table 

The top ten listed NOCs by the number of gold medals are listed below. The host nation, South Korea, is highlighted.

Participating delegations 
Sixty delegations took part in the Seoul Paralympics. Burma, which had taken part in the previous Games, was absent. The Seoul Paralympics occurred weeks after the 8888 Uprising and the military coup which brought the State Peace and Development Council to power. Burma would return as Myanmar in 1992.

The Soviet Union made its Summer Paralympic début, previously participating in the 1988 Winter Paralympics. It was not only the USSR's first participation in the Summer Games but was also to be its last, as the Union was dissolved before the 1992 Summer Paralympics. It won a total of 56 medals, of which 21 were gold. Other countries who made first appearances were Bulgaria, Cyprus, Iran, Macau, Morocco, Oman, Philippines, Singapore and Tunisia.

 
 
 
 
 
 
 
 
 
 
 
 
 
 
 
 
 
 
 
 
 
 
 
 
 
 
 
 
 
 
 
 
 
 
 
 
   Macau (7)

See also 

 1988 Summer Olympics
 1988 Winter Paralympics

References

External links
International Paralympic Committee

 
Paralympics Summer
Paralympics
Paralympics
Multi-sport events in South Korea
Paralympic Games
Sports competitions in Seoul
Summer Paralympic Games
1980s in Seoul
October 1988 sports events in Asia
Bear mascots